Virginia State Route 7 (VA 7) is a major primary state highway and busy commuter route in northern Virginia, United States.  It travels southeast from downtown Winchester to SR 400 (Washington Street) in downtown Alexandria. Its route largely parallels those of the Washington & Old Dominion Trail (W&OD Trail) and the Potomac River. Between its western terminus and Interstate 395 (I-395), SR 7 is part of the National Highway System. In 1968, the Virginia State Highway Commission designated the road as the "Harry Flood Byrd Highway" between Alexandria and Winchester to commemorate Harry F. Byrd Sr. (1887–1966).

Route description

SR 7 begins downtown in the independent city of Winchester, as East Piccadilly Street at an intersection with U.S. Route 11 (US 11) and US 522, and it continues through the east end of the city, along North East Lane, National Avenue, and finally Berryville Avenue. SR 7 exits the city into surrounding Frederick County, where its name changes to Berryville Pike and it becomes a four-lane highway. SR 7 continues across I-81 and then into Clarke County.

SR 7 enters Clarke County from Frederick County, crossing Opequon Creek, and continues towards the town of Berryville. Business SR 7 (SR 7 Bus.) splits off just west of Berryville and passes through the town, while the main route bypasses the town to the north. Both routes cross US 340, and SR 7 Bus. rejoins SR 7 just east of the town. SR 7 crosses the Shenandoah River and its name changes to the Harry Flood Byrd Highway. SR 7 crosses the Loudoun–Clarke county line and the Appalachian Trail at the summit of Snickers Gap in the Blue Ridge Mountains.

SR 7 descends out of the Blue Ridge Mountains and enters the rural western area of Loudoun County as the Harry Flood Byrd Highway at Snickers Gap. It intersects the northern end of the Snickersville Turnpike, and then it passes just north of the village of Bluemont (formerly Snickersville). Next SR 7 curves just south of Jefferson County, West Virginia.

SR 7 becomes a divided, limited-access highway with a speed limit of  just west of the town of Round Hill, where another SR 7 Bus. splits off to serve the towns of Round Hill, Purcellville, and Hamilton, while the main road runs outside of the towns as a bypass. SR 7 Bus. rejoins the main road at the interchange with SR 9 in Paeonian Springs.

SR 7 continues towards the well-developed eastern half of Loudoun County as a four-lane divided highway with some at-grade intersections, and it passes through Clarke's Gap in Catoctin Mountain. Another SR 7 Bus. splits off on the western side of the town of Leesburg, the county seat of Loudoun County. The main road continues as the Leesburg Bypass, and merges with the bypass of US 15 around the southern side of Leesburg, while the business route passes through town as Market Street. SR 7 Business intersects with US 15 Business (King Street) by the county courthouse in the center of Leesburg.

The Virginia Department of Transportation (VDOT) has plans to widen the section of SR 7 between SR 9 and East Market Street. However, due to highway budget restrictions, this project was put on hold in June 2008. As of December 2014, construction had begun on the widening of this section of SR 7. In addition to widening Westbound SR 7 from two to three lanes, the median will be modified to limit left turns into and out of Roxbury Hall Road, Leeland Orchard Road, Fort Johnston Road, White Gate Place, and Beechnut Place. In addition to the work on SR 7, roundabouts will be installed at the interchange between SR 7 and SR 9. The southern roundabout will combine the separate intersections of the on and off ramps from SR 7 and Colonial Highway/Dry Mill Road into one.

The SR 7 bypass crosses the Washington & Old Dominion Trail just before the US 15 bypass splits off from SR 7 in eastern Leesburg, and then SR 7 Bus. rejoins the main highway near the same location. SR 7 continues on through the eastern half of Leesburg, with six lanes. It then crosses Goose Creek, and passes through Ashburn.

SR 7 was rebuilt as a controlled-access highway through eastern Loudoun County.  To accomplish this, highway interchanges were constructed replacing the ordinary intersections at Belmont Ridge Road, Loudoun County Parkway, Riverside Parkway, and Ashburn Village Boulevard while closing the intersection at Lexington Drive. A new overpass was constructed to carry Sycolin Road across SR 7 in Leesburg, which opened to traffic on August 11, 2014. 

An additional interchange was also opened at Battlefield Parkway in Leesburg on June 28, 2021.

SR 7 continues as a controlled-access freeway and passes by numerous housing subdivisions, businesses, and shopping areas before it reaches an interchange with SR 28, close to the Fairfax County line in Sterling.

SR 7 is named Leesburg Pike all the way across Fairfax County, where it is mainly a suburban route. It enters Fairfax County at the intersection with Dranesville Road (SR 228), approximately half a mile west of the interchange with the Fairfax County Parkway (SR 286) and Algonkian Parkway.  It continues through Fairfax County, passing by subdivisions in unincorporated Great Falls, Vienna, and Reston.  It passes through Tysons, where it has interchanges with SR 267 (the Dulles Access and Toll Roads) and  SR 123 before passing south of the Tysons Corner Center shopping mall. It then intersects the Capital Beltway (I-495) in McLean and intersects I-66 a half mile (0.8 km) west of the West Falls Church Metro station.

SR 7 then enters the independent city of Falls Church and becomes Broad Street and marks the north/south division for city streets.  The road intersects US 29 in the city's center and crosses the W&OD Trail in the city's west end.  SR 7 then re-enters Fairfax County as Leesburg Pike and passes through Seven Corners, named for the five roads that intersect, including SR 338 (Hillwood Avenue) and US 50 (Arlington Boulevard), which is grade separated from the rest of the intersection.  From there, it travels to Bailey's Crossroads, where it intersects SR 244 (Columbia Pike).

SR 7 enters the City of Alexandria from Fairfax County and briefly forms the border between the Alexandria and Arlington County, and then intersects I-395. It continues as King Street through Alexandria, passing by Alexandria City High School, George Washington Masonic National Memorial, Union Station (Amtrak and Virginia Railway Express), and the King Street – Old Town Metro station. SR 7 ends at the intersection of King Street and SR 400 (Washington Street) in Old Town Alexandria, one quarter of a mile (0.4 km) west of the Potomac River.

Future

Intersection at Baron Cameron Avenue 
On August 19, 2019, a third left-turn lane was added from SR 7 west to Baron Cameron Avenue.  This was in place of constructing a partial interchange at the intersection, for which SR 7 east lanes would travel under Baron Cameron Avenue; the project was never started, as VDOT failed to allocate sufficient funding for the project and lack of competition led to higher than forecasted bids for the Route 7 widening.

Fairfax County widening project 
VDOT is working on widening SR 7 from four to six lanes and adding shared-use paths along SR 7 between Reston Avenue and Jarrett Valley Drive in Fairfax County.  The project is expected to cost $313.9 million and should be completed by mid-2024.

Renaming the highway in Loudoun County 
The Loudoun County Board of Supervisors voted to rename the section of SR 7 within Loudoun County from Harry Byrd Highway to Leesburg Pike on December 7, 2021. This is in an effort to restore historical names and remove segregationist and Confederate symbols throughout the county.

Major intersections

Special routes

Berryville business route

State Route 7 Business (SR 7 Bus.) is a business route in the U.S. state of Virginia. It follows Main Street through downtown Berryville.

Purcellville business route

State Route 7 Business (SR 7 Bus.) is a business route in the U.S. state of Virginia. It runs  from SR 7 just west of Round Hill to SR 9 just west of Leesburg, where the roadway continues east and south as SR 699. The route provides access from the main route, SR 7, to Purcellville. The route has multiple names along its length including Loudoun Street, Main Street, and Colonial Highway. The route was formed in two segments. The first one was formed in 1980, and the second one was formed in 1987.

The route's western end is at its parent route, SR 7. It then intersects New Cut Road and Main Street, both part of SR 719. It meets SR 7 once again at a diamond interchange. After that, the route meets State Route 287 (SR 287) at a roundabout.  The route's eastern end is at State Route 9 (SR 9) (Charles Town Pike), where it goes east and south as SR 699 (Dry Mill Rd.).

The first segment of the route was commissioned in 1980 between SR 287 and SR 9. The second segment of the route was commissioned in 1987 between SR 287 and SR 7. These segments were both designated along the former alignment of its parent route, SR 7.

Leesburg business route

State Route 7 Business (SR 7 Bus.) is a business route in the U.S. state of Virginia. It follows Market Street through downtown Leesburg. In downtown Leesburg, SR 7 Bus. intersects with US 15 Bus.

References

External links

SR 7 at The Virginia Highways Project

007
State Route 007
State Route 007
State Route 007
State Route 007
State Route 007
State Route 007
State Route 007
State Route 007